In mathematics, the Hall–Petresco identity (sometimes misspelled Hall–Petrescu identity) is an identity holding in any group. It can be proved using the commutator collecting process, and implies that p-groups of small class are regular.

Statement

The Hall–Petresco identity states that if x and y are elements of a group G and m is a positive integer then

where each ci is in the subgroup Ki of the descending central series of G.

See also
 Baker–Campbell–Hausdorff formula
 Algebra of symbols

References

P-groups
Combinatorial group theory